Cycloneritida (nerites and false-limpets) is an order of land snails, freshwater snails, and sea snails.

These are gastropod molluscs within the subclass Neritimorpha. 14 of the families in the order are extant, and eight of the families are extinct. 

It was previously categorized as the clade Cycloneritimorpha.

According to the Taxonomy of the Gastropoda (Bouchet & Rocroi, 2005), as well as the Cycloneritida, the subclass Neritimorpha also contains the (entirely fossil) clade Cyrtoneritimorpha, plus a number of other fossil families that are currently unassigned.

The earliest evolutionary forms of Cycloneritimorpha show double visceral organs, double gills, and normally a double-chambered heart.

Taxonomy
The taxonomy of Cycloneritida is based on work by Kano et al. (2002) that recognizes 4 clades. These clades are established on genetic analysis (28S rRNA) of recent species only. These clades proposed by Kano are ranked as superfamilies in the taxonomy of the Gastropoda (Bouchet & Rocroi, 2005).

The spelling of Cycloneritimorpha has been amended to the order Cycloneritida  in the new taxonomy of the Gastropoda by Bouchet and Rocroi in 2017 

Clade Cycloneritimorpha contains:
Superfamily Helicinoidea
Family Helicinidae
 † Family Dawsonellidae
 † Family Deaniridae
Family Neritiliidae
Family Proserpinellidae
Family Proserpinidae
Superfamily Hydrocenoidea
Family Hydrocenidae
 † Superfamily Naticopsoidea Waagen, 1880 
Superfamily Neritoidea
Family Neritidae
Family Phenacolepadidae
 † Family Pileolidae
Superfamily Neritopsoidea
Family Neritopsidae
 † Family Cortinellidae
 † Family Delphinulopsidae
 † Family Plagiothyridae
 † Family Pseudorthonychiidae
Family Titiscaniidae
 † Superfamily Symmetrocapuloidea
 † Family Symmetrocapulidae

References

Gastropod taxonomy